Moscow is a cantata composed by Pyotr Ilyich Tchaikovsky in 1883 for the coronation of Alexander III of Russia, to a Russian libretto by Apollon Maykov. It is scored for mezzo-soprano, baritone, mixed chorus (SATB), 3 flutes, 2 oboes, 2 clarinets, 2 bassoons, 4 horns, 2 trumpets, 3 trombones, tuba, timpani, harp and strings.

Structure
Introduction and chorus. Andante religioso (A major)
Arioso. Moderato con moto (D major)
Chorus. Allegro (D major)
Monologue and chorus. Moderato – Largo (B minor)
Arioso. Andante molto sostenuto (E-flat minor)
Finale. Moderato con moto (D major)

References

Sources

External links

Tchaikovsky Research

Compositions by Pyotr Ilyich Tchaikovsky
1883 compositions
Russian patriotic songs
Cantatas